The Rural Municipality of Shamrock No. 134 is a rural municipality (RM) in the Canadian province of Saskatchewan within Census Division No. 7 and  Division No. 2. Located in the south-central portion of the province, it is south of Highway 1 (the Trans-Canada Highway).

History 
The RM of Shamrock No. 134 incorporated as a rural municipality on December 9, 1912.

Geography

Communities and localities 
The following urban municipalities are surrounded by the RM.

Villages
Shamrock

The following unincorporated communities are within the RM.

Localities
Kelstern

Demographics 

Government 
The RM of Shamrock No. 134 is governed by an elected municipal council and an appointed administrator that meets on the second Thursday of every month. The reeve of the RM is Wayne Rud while its administrator is Jody Kennedy. The RM's office is located in Shamrock.

References 

Shamrock
Division No. 7, Saskatchewan